Sweet Buns is a South Korean television series starring Choi Kang-hee, Park Gwang-hyun, Jung Chan and Jung So-young. It aired on MBC from July 4, 2004 to January 16, 2005 every Sunday at 8:55 a.m. for 26 episodes.

Plot
Ga-ran and Nam-joon were classmates in elementary school. Ga-ran is a tomboy who prefers trousers to skirts, and loves taekwondo more than her piano lessons. Nam-joon on the other hand is Mr. Perfect who's got good looks, a fine brain, and is the most popular guy in school, especially among the girls. One day, Ga-ran sees Nam-joon giving away the sweet bun which Ga-ran's friend gave him, to another girl. Ga-ran throws herself at Nam-joon and beats him up, and their rivalry lasts throughout high school. A few years after college, Ga-ran and Nam-joon meet again as adults, both recovering from recent break-ups. Despite their constant bickering, they gradually realize that they're meant to be.

Cast
Choi Kang-hee as Han Ga-ran
Shim Eun-kyung as young Ga-ran
Park Gwang-hyun as Ahn Nam-joon
Kang Sung-hyun as young Nam-joon
Jung Chan as Yoo Kwan-ha
Jung So-young as Hong Hye-jan
Ryu Hyun-kyung as Kim Sun-hee, Ga-ran's housemate
Kim Han as Lee Deok-jin
Kim Na-woon as Ahn Nam-hee, Nam-joon's older sister
Park Kwang-jung as Choi Jung-hoon, Nam-hee's husband
Jung Kyung-ho as Lee Ki-dong
Lee Bom as Soo-hee
Song Jae-ho as Jeon Young-il, Ga-ran's school principal
Jung Han-heon as Hwang Jung-gu
Kim Ji-wan as Lee Shin-hyuk
Yoo Seung-ho as young Shin-hyuk
Kim Sung-joo as interviewer
Kim Nam-gil as Hye-jan's boyfriend
MC Mong (cameo)

References

External links
Sweet Buns official MBC website 
Sweet Buns at MBC Global Media

MBC TV television dramas
2004 South Korean television series debuts
2005 South Korean television series endings
Korean-language television shows
South Korean romance television series
South Korean comedy television series
Television shows set in North Jeolla Province